The Organization of Angolan Women (Portuguese: Organização Mulher Angolana (OMA)) is a political organisation in Angola, which was founded in 1962 to target women to support the People's Movement for the Liberation of Angola. It was co-founded by Deolinda Rodrigues Francisco de Almeida.

History 
The Organization of Angolan Women was established in 1962 and was originally founded to rally support for the new political party known as the MPLA. Once Angola was officially independent of Portugal in 1975 following the Angolan War of Independence, the Organization of Angolan Women provided the best opportunity for female activism in local government. Total involvement faltered in the 1980s. In 1985 membership reached 1.8 million, but by 1987 membership dropped to less than 1.3 million. Rural violence and regional destabilization disheartened many of the rural members. However, it was also during the 1980s that Angola passed the first anti-discrimination laws and established strict literacy laws to support uneducated women.

Ruth Neto, the sister of the former president of Angola, was elected to be secretary general of the OMA and the head of its fifty-three-member national committee in 1983. She was re-elected on March 2, 1988. The OMA expanded education for women, created programs to increase literacy among women, and during the 1980s the Angolan government created laws against gender discrimination in wages and working conditions.

In 1999, Luzia Inglês Van-Dúnem was elected Secretary-General of the Organização Mulher Angolana (OMA), which is the women's branch of political party, the People's Movement for the Liberation of Angola(MPLA), and was re-elected in 2005.

Secretary Generals 
 Ruth Neto (elected 1983; re-elected 1988)
 Luzia Inglês Van-Dúnem (elected 1999; re-elected 2005)

References

Women in Angola
Women's organizations based in Angola
MPLA
Women's wings of political parties
1962 establishments in Angola
Women's wings of communist parties
Organizations established in 1962